Kamilche is an unincorporated community in Mason County, Washington, United States.
Primarily a farm area, Kamilche is also the home to the Squaxin Indian Tribe. It is at the crossroads of U.S. Route 101 and State Route 108. Kamilche sits at the edge of Little Skookum Inlet, a finger waterway off Puget Sound.

References 

Unincorporated communities in Washington (state)
Unincorporated communities in Mason County, Washington